The Rocturnals (formerly known as KansasCali) is an American alternative rock band from Las Vegas, Nevada.

Formed in 2003, the band has five members, lead vocalist A. Johnson, lead vocalist-rapper Aulsondro Hamilton, lead guitarist Tristan Cannizarro, rhythm guitarist Adam Crow, and drummer Eric Borders. The band's mainstream debut came as KansasCali in 2004, when the song "If I..." appeared on both the soundtrack and DVD of the 2005 Academy Award-winning movie, Crash. The music video also featured in the "Special Features" section of the DVD and appeared on the concept album, Crash: Music from and Inspired by Crash.

Biography
Following the band's success with Crash, it was invited to feature on the soundtrack for Mr. & Mrs. Smith. The band responded with a more mid-tempo song, in comparison to "If I...", entitled, "If I Never See You Again".

The band's soundtrack success led them to be selected by Tamara Coniff, former editor-in-chief of Billboard magazine, as the opening band for Billboard's 1st Annual Digital Entertainment and Media Awards. The band was subsequently selected to appear on four other movie soundtracks: Haven, a 2004 action movie starring Orlando Bloom and Zoe Saldana, ESPN's Once in a Lifetime: The Extraordinary Story of the New York Cosmos, about New York's soccer team, Kickin It Old Skool a comedy starring Jamie Kennedy and Bobby Lee, and John Feal's documentary Save The Brave.

DVD controversy
The band's appearance on the Crash DVD did not occur without controversy. Bird York, who created the movie's theme song, "In the Deep", but did not feature on the DVD, complained about the band's inclusion. York communicated with Lionsgate, Bob Yari and Superb Records and requested to have the band's song removed, and it subsequently did not appear in the director's cut version of the DVD.

Discography

Songs and albums

Television Show Songs

Current members
 A. "Pittboss" Johnson – lead vocals, singer  (2000–present)
 Aulsondro "Novelist" Hamilton – lead vocals, rapper (2000–present)
 Eric "E" Borders – drummer (2004–present)
 Adam "Crow" – guitarist (2006–present)
 Tristan "Trist" Cannizarro– lead guitarist (2010–present)

References

External links
The Rocturnals Official Site – Black Casino Music & Entertainment

Interviews
 Interview in The List Magazine (Music/sports/fashion/scene) April 2011
 Interview in Las Vegas Review-Journal February 2011
 Interview in Nine5Four The Magazine
 Interview in Blacktree Media, February 2010

Musical groups established in 2003
Musical groups from Nevada
Musical groups from Las Vegas